Tom Mayson (February 1, 1928 – October 18, 2010) was a Canadian football player who played for the Edmonton Eskimos. He previously played for the Alberta Golden Bears. Mayson's grandson, Joffrey Lupul, who is a NHL player, played for the Edmonton Oilers while Mayson was a former member of the Edmonton Investors Group (EIG), the limited partnership that owned the Edmonton Oilers.

References

1928 births
2010 deaths
Canadian football running backs
Alberta Golden Bears football players
Edmonton Elks players
Edmonton Oilers executives
Players of Canadian football from Alberta
Canadian football people from Edmonton